The 2021 Tamworth Borough Council election took place on 6 May 2021 to elect members of Tamworth Borough Council in England. This was on the same day as other local elections.

Results summary

Ward results

Amington

Belgrave

Bolehall

Castle

Glascote

Mercian

Spital

Stonydelph

Trinity

Wilnecote

By-elections

Spital

References

Tamworth
2021
2020s in Staffordshire